Portulaca kuriensis is a species of flowering plant in the purslane family, Portulacaceae, that is endemic to Yemen.  Its natural habitats are subtropical or tropical dry shrubland and rocky areas.

References

kuriensis
Endemic flora of Socotra
Threatened flora of Asia
Vulnerable plants
Taxonomy articles created by Polbot